KSJV (91.5 FM) is a radio station  broadcasting a Spanish Variety format. Licensed to Fresno, California, United States, the station serves the Fresno area.  The station is currently owned by Radio Bilingüe, Inc. The station is also broadcast on HD radio.

See also
List of community radio stations in the United States

References

External links

FCC History Cards for KSJV

SJV
SJV
Community radio stations in the United States